Hyospathe is a genus of flowering plant in the family Arecaceae, native to South America and Central America. It contains the following species:

References

 
Arecaceae genera
Taxonomy articles created by Polbot